King v. Chapman is a 1945 court case between Primus King, a religious leader and barber in Columbus, Georgia, and  J. E. Chapman, Jr., the chair of the Muscogee County Democratic Party. It ruled the white primary as used by the Democratic Party of Georgia to be unconstitutional. This case followed the Smith v. Allwright case, which struck down the white primaries in Texas and began the downfall of white primaries in other Deep South states.

Background and ruling

On July 4, 1944, Primus E. King, an African-American registered voter, went to the Muscogee County Courthouse in Columbus to cast his vote in the Democratic Party’s primary election. He was turned away by law enforcement. Dr. Thomas Brewer, a local physician who co-founded the local branch of the NAACP, encouraged and financially supported Mr. King in his lawsuit filed in federal court. In a landmark ruling in 1945, the United States District Court for the Middle District of Georgia found in Mr. King's favor, deciding that the exclusion of black voters was unconstitutional under the Fourteenth, Fifteenth and Seventeenth Amendments. The U.S. Court of Appeals affirmed, and the U.S. Supreme Court refused to hear the appeal by Chapman, which ended the white primary in Georgia.

Impact
The end of the white primary in Georgia allowed African Americans to pursue the right to vote in Georgia for the first time, although the enforcement of poll taxes, literacy tests and the County Unit System would remain a significant barrier to most African-American voters in Georgia until the 1960s. It would take nearly two decades before Leroy Johnson, the first African American to serve in the Georgia General Assembly, would be elected.

King v. Chapman also served as an inspiration to Martin Luther King Jr., then a 15-year-old who was admitted to Morehouse College.

References

1944 in United States case law
20th-century American trials
African-American segregation in the United States
Civil rights movement case law
History of voting rights in the United States
United States district court cases
United States elections case law
United States equal protection case law
United States Fourteenth Amendment case law
United States Fifteenth Amendment case law
United States Seventeenth Amendment case law
Primary elections in the United States
Democratic Party (United States) litigation
Politics of Georgia (U.S. state)
Georgia (U.S. state) elections
Democratic Party of Georgia
United States District Court case articles without infoboxes
United States racial discrimination case law